James, Jimmy, or Jim Wright may refer to:

Arts and entertainment
James Wright (poet) (1927–1980), American poet
James Wright (singer), Filipino-Australian singer
Big Jim Wright  (James Quentin Wright) (1966–2018), American musician
Jimmy Wright (actor), American stage and screen actor
Jimmy Wright (artist) (born 1944), American visual artist

Politics

U.S. politics
Sir James Wright (governor) (1716–1785), British colonial governor of the province of Georgia, and 1st Baronet, of Carolside
J. Skelly Wright (1911–1988), American judge
James A. Wright (Pennsylvania politician) (1902–1963), U.S. Congressman from Pennsylvania
James A. Wright (Wisconsin politician) (1873–1911), Wisconsin politician and businessman
James L. Wright (1925–1990), Pennsylvania politician
Jim Wright (1922–2015), U.S. Congressman from Texas, Speaker of the House
Jim Wright (commissioner), American politician and businessman from Texas
James Henry Wright (1838–1905), American jurist and politician

Other politics
Sir James Wright (governor) (1716–1785), British colonial governor of the province of Georgia, and 1st Baronet, of Carolside
Sir James Wright, 1st Baronet (1730–1804) of Ray House, Essex and Resident at Venice, British diplomat 
James R. Wright, Canadian diplomat
James Wright (Jamaican politician) (1904–1984/85), member of the Legislative Council of Jamaica
James William Wright (1854–1917), Australian architect and politician

Sports

Baseball
Jim Wright (1920s pitcher) (1900–1963), Major League Baseball pitcher
Jim Wright (1970s pitcher) (born 1950), Major League Baseball pitcher
Jim Wright (1980s pitcher) (born 1955), Major League Baseball pitcher

Cricket
James Wright (cricketer, born 1948), English cricketer
James Wright (cricketer, born 1874) (1874–1961), English cricketer
James Wright (cricketer, born 1912) (1912–1987), English cricketer
James Wright (New Zealand cricketer) (born 1946), New Zealand cricketer

Gridiron football
James Wright (tight end) (born 1956), American football tight end
James Wright (wide receiver) (born 1991), American football player
James Earl Wright (American football) (1939–2009), gridiron football defensive back and quarterback
Jim Wright (American football coach) (born 1935), American football coach

Other sports
James Leroy Wright (1938–2020), American basketball player
Jimmy Wright (golfer) (born 1939), American professional golfer
James Wright (ice hockey) (born 1990), Canadian ice hockey player
James Wright (rugby) (1863–1932), rugby union footballer of the 1890s for England, and Bradford F.C.
James Wright (speedway rider) (born 1986), British motorcycle speedway rider
James Wright (footballer) (1892–?), footballer for Cliftonville and Huddersfield Town
Jim Wright (Australian footballer) (born 1949), Australian rules footballer (Geelong)
Jim Wright (footballer, born 1910) (1910–1978), English footballer
James Earl Wright, a ring name of American professional wrestler Dale Veasey (born 1960)

Others
James Wright (academic) (born 1939), former Vice-Chancellor, Newcastle University
James Wright (antiquarian) (1643–1713), antiquary and writer
James Wright (doctor) (1927–2022), Australian medical professional
James Wright (historian) (born 1939), President of Dartmouth College, historian
James Wright (inventor), American creator of Silly Putty
James Wright (palaeontologist) (1878–1957), Scottish fossil expert
James Wright (potter) (1819–1887), New Zealand potter
James C. Wright, American classical archaeologist 
James D. Wright (1947–2019), American sociologist
James Homer Wright (1869–1928), American pathologist
James Hood Wright (1836–1894), American banker, financier and railroad man
James W. Wright, executive director of the Development Authority of the North Country
James Whitaker Wright (1846–1904), English mining company owner
James William Wright (1854–1917), Australian architect and politician

See also
Jamey Wright (born 1974), baseball player
Jamie Wright (born 1976), ice hockey player
Jay Wright (disambiguation)
Cottage Grove State Airport or Jim Wright Field, Lane County, Oregon, USA